Tightlacing (also called corset training) is the practice of wearing a tightly-laced corset. It is done to achieve cosmetic modifications to the figure and posture or to experience the sensation of bodily restriction.

History
Corsets were first worn by members of both sexes of Minoans of Crete, but did not become popular again until the sixteenth century. They remained a feature of fashionable dress until the French Revolution, when corsets for women were designed mainly to turn the torso into a fashionable cylindrical shape, although they narrowed the waist as well. They had shoulder straps, ended at the waist, flattened the bust, and, in so doing, pushed the breasts up. The emphasis of the corset became less on the smallness of the waist than on the contrast between the rigid flatness of the bodice front and the curving tops of the breasts peeking over the top of the corset.

At the end of the eighteenth century, the corset fell into decline. Fashion for women embraced the Empire silhouette: a Graeco-Roman style, with the high-waisted dress that was unique to this style gathered under the breasts. The waist was no longer emphasised, and dresses were sewn from thin muslins rather than the heavy brocades and satins of the aristocratic high fashion style preceding it.

The reign of the Empire waist was short. In the 1830s, shoulders widened (with puffy gigot sleeves or flounces), skirts widened (layers of stiffened petticoats), and the waistline narrowed and migrated toward a natural position. By the 1850s, exaggerated shoulders were out of fashion and waistlines were cinched at the natural waist above a wide skirt. Fashion had achieved what is now known as the Victorian silhouette.

In the 1830s, the artificially inflated shoulders and skirts made the intervening waist look narrow, even with the corset laced only moderately. When the exaggerated shoulders disappeared, the style dictated that the waist had to be cinched tightly in order to achieve the same effect. During the 1840s and 1850s, "tightlacing" was ordinary fashion taken to an extreme.

Young and fashionable women were most likely to tightlace, especially for balls, fashionable gatherings, and other occasions for display. Older, poorer, and primmer women would have laced moderately – just enough "to be decent".

The Victorian and Edwardian corset differed from earlier corsets in numerous ways. The corset no longer ended at the waist, but flared out and ended several inches below the waist. The corset was exaggeratedly curvaceous rather than cylindrical. It became much sturdier in construction, thanks to improvements in technology. Spiral steel stays curved with the figure rather than dictating a cylindrical silhouette. While many corsets were still sewn by hand to the wearer's measurements, there was also a thriving market in cheaper mass-produced corsets.

In the late years of the Victorian era, medical reports and rumors claimed that tightlacing was fatally detrimental to health (see Victorian dress reform). Women who suffered to achieve small waists were also condemned for their vanity and excoriated from the pulpit as slaves to fashion. It was frequently claimed that too small a waist was ugly rather than beautiful. Dress reformers exhorted women to abandon the tyranny of stays and free their waists for work and healthy exercise.

Despite the efforts of dress reformers to eliminate the corset, and despite medical and clerical warnings, women persisted in tightlacing. In the early 1900s, the small corseted waist began to fall out of fashion. The feminist and dress reform movements had made practical clothing acceptable for work or exercise. The rise of the Artistic Dress movement made loose clothing and the natural waist fashionable even for evening wear. Couturiers such as Fortuny and Poiret designed exotic, alluring costumes in pleated or draped silks, calculated to reveal slim, youthful bodies. If one didn't have such a body, new undergarments, the brassiere and the girdle, promised to give the illusion of one.

Corsets were no longer fashionable, but they entered the underworld of the fetish, along with items such as bondage gear and vinyl catsuits. From the 1960s to the 1990s, fetish wear became a fashion trend and corsets made something of a resurgence. They are often worn as top garments rather than underwear. Most corset wearers own a few bustiers or fashionable authentic corsets for evening wear, but they do not tightlace. Historical reenactors often wear corsets, but few tightlace.

Notable adherents
 Empress Elisabeth of Austria (Sisi); 19.5 inches (49-50 cm)
 Polaire; about 1914; 13–14 inches (33–36 cm)
 Cathie Jung; 2006; 15 inches (38 cm)
 Dita Von Teese; 16.5 inches (42 cm)
 Maud of Wales; queen of Norway ; 18 inches (45 cm)
 Ethel Granger; 13 inches (33 cm)

See also
 Body modification
 Corset controversy
 Hourglass corset

Tightlacing-related
 Skin-tight garment
 Zentai

References

Further reading
 Le corset; étude physiologique et pratique
 Tight Lacing, Peter Farrer.  
 The Corset and the Crinoline. A Book of Modes and Costumes from remote periods to the present time. Lord William Barry. (1869)
 Valerie Steele, The Corset: A Cultural History. Yale University Press, 2001,  .
 David Kunzle, "Fashion and fetishism: a social history of the corset, tight-lacing, and other forms of body-sculpture in the West", Rowman and Littlefield, 1982, 
 Bound To Please: A History of the Victorian Corset, Leigh Summers, Berg Publishers, 2001. 

1840s fashion
19th-century fashion
20th-century fashion
Corsetry
History of clothing (Western fashion)
Body modification
Fetish clothing
Fashion-related fetishism